Rögle BK (Rögle Bandyklubb) is a Swedish professional ice hockey club from Ängelholm that has been playing in the SHL since the 2015–16 season. Rögle has previously played in the SHL (previously named Elitserien) in 1992–1996, 2008–2010, and briefly in 2012–13.

They won the Champions Hockey League in 2022

History
Rögle BK was founded on 18 December 1932 as a Swedish bandy club, which is why the team is named "Rögle Bandyklubb" (or "bandy club"). The club was actually Scanian district champions in bandy in 1948. The club's ice hockey team played in the top Swedish league, at that time Division I, from 1966 to 1969, and again, in Elitserien as it was called at the time, between 1992–93 and 1995–96. After another twelve years in the second-tier division HockeyAllsvenskan, the team was promoted back to Elitserien after finishing second in the 2008 Kvalserien. Rögle BK began the 2008–09 Elitserien season surprisingly well, and after the first 18 rounds the team found itself at a top position, only goals behind leading Linköpings HC. However, Rögle BK finished eleventh in the 2008–09 Elitserien season and therefore had to play in the 2009 Kvalserien to stay in Elitserien, which they achieved after finishing second in Kvalserien for the second time in a row. In 2009–10 they ended last in the standings and had to play in the 2010 Kvalserien, where they subsequently failed to re-qualify for Elitserien and were relegated to HockeyAllsvenskan.

Rögle briefly returned to Elitserien after finishing second in the 2012 Kvalserien, becoming the first team to claim an Elitserien spot after winning the HockeyAllsvenskan playoff round to earn the last spot in the Kvalserien. However, after finishing last in the 2012–13 Elitserien season, Rögle had to play in the 2013 Kvalserien to stay in Elitserien, but the team failed to re-qualify and were relegated back to the second-tier league HockeyAllsvenskan; Rögle's return to Elitserien lasted for only one season.

The 2021–2022 season saw the club winning the Champions Hockey League by defeating Tappara from Finland, 2–1, in the final game in Ängelholm on 1 March 2022.

On 14 December 2022, the club announced its plans of starting a women's team for the 2023–2024 season, beginning with playing in the WDHL.

Season-by-season record
This list features the five most recent seasons. For a more complete list, see List of Rögle BK seasons.

Players and personnel

Current roster

Updated 25 February 2023

Team captains

 Per Wallin, 2000–01
 Roger Hansson, 2001–03
 Pelle Svensson, 2003–05
 Kenny Jönsson, 2005–09
 Daniel Glimmenvall, 2009–10
 Eric Beaudoin, 2009–10
 Andrée Brendheden, 2010–11
 Jakob Johansson, 2011–13
 Andreas Lilja, 2013–15
 Christopher Liljewall, 2015–17
 Taylor Matson, 2018–19
 Mattias Sjögren, 2019–22
 Anton Bengtsson, 2022–present

Honored members

References

External links

Official website 
Angel Island Army supporter's club

 
Swedish Hockey League teams
Ice hockey teams in Sweden
Sport in Ängelholm
Bandy clubs established in 1932
1932 establishments in Sweden
Ice hockey teams in Skåne County
20th-century establishments in Skåne County